Favartia pacei is a species of sea snail, a marine gastropod mollusk in the family Muricidae, the murex snails or rock snails.

Description

Distribution

References

Muricidae
Gastropods described in 1988